Sigmoidala is a monotypic genus of flowering plants in the family Fabaceae, first established in 2019. Its only species is Sigmoidala kityana, native to Myanmar, northern Thailand and Laos. It was first described by William Grant Craib in 1927 as Millettia kityana.

Description
Sigmoidala kityana is a robust woody twining vine. Its young stems are very dark green. Its leaves are evergreen and generally have 6–8 pairs of leaflets plus a terminal leaflet. Its inner surface is white flushed pink with a broad golden-yellow nectar guide. They have short basal claws. Nine of the stamens are fused together, the other is free; all curve upwards at the apex.

Taxonomy

The species was first described as Millettia kityana by William Grant Craib in 1927. Anne M. Schot transferred it to Callerya in 1995. A 2019 molecular phylogenetic study showed that it fell outside the clade containing the type species of Callerya, and established the new genus Sigmoidala for this species. The generic name refers to the sigmoid-shaped wing petals. Its closest relatives are Endosamara and Sarcodum, from which it can be distinguished in a number of ways. The wing petals of Sigmoidala are unique within the tribe Wisterieae in having a sigmoid shape, bent sharply back at the midpoint before extending forwards again. The flattened seed pods of Sigmoidala are shorter than those of Endosamara and also differ from the sausage-shaped pods of Sarcodum.

Distribution and habitat
, Plants of the World Online listed the distribution of Sigmoidala kityana as Myanmar to north and north-eastern Thailand and Laos, growing primarily in the seasonally dry tropical biome. Compton et al.

References

Wisterieae
Monotypic Fabaceae genera